In the U.S. state of South Carolina, U.S. Route 221 (US 221) is a 126.390-mile (203.405 km) United States Highway within the state. It is part of the United States Numbered Highway System that travels from Perry in North Florida to Lynchburg in Central Virginia. While in South Carolina, the highway travels through Greenwood, Laurens, Woodruff, and Spartanburg. The highway mostly travels through rural parts of the Piedmont region of the state.

Route description

US Route 221 enters McCormick County from Georgia from the top of the J. Strom Thurmond Dam at the southeastern edge of Lake Strom Thurmond. The first site in the state is the Thurmond Lake Overlook. Almost instantly curves to the north but then to the east before seeming to terminate at South Carolina State Highway 28 in Clarks Hill, South Carolina (which is part of the Savannah River Scenic Byway), but in reality turns left and joins the road in a concurrency. US 221/SC 28 runs north and northwesterly often being flanked by a railroad line along the east side as it passes through Modoc where it encounters the Hamilton Branch State Park and Recreation Area, and later Parksville which contains the Parksville State Recreation Area. The road widens to four lanes as it enters Plum Branch and after a road to the Plum Branch Yacht Club, has a blinker light intersection with the western terminus of South Carolina Highway 283 and a local road named Collier Street.

Shifting a bit further away from the coast it eventually enters the town of McCormick. From McCormick, it leaves SC 28, and briefly joins a concurrency with U.S. Route 378 until that route breaks away at East Gold Street. From there it continues northeasterly into the woods. After crossing the McCormick-Greenwood County Line, US 221 joins a concurrency with South Carolina Highway 10 south of Bradley. Along the way, US 221/SC 10 runs along the south side of the same railroad line it flanked the west side of since the SC 28 concurrency. After the intersection with Callison Road, and later two other local streets, SC 10 branches off to the northwest towards Verdery, and US 221 leaves the Sumter National Forest. Twelve miles later, it runs into the city of Greenwood. Along the way it is joined by another concurrency with U.S. Routes 25/178, and runs south and east along the edge of the city, then turns east onto South Carolina Highway 72.

From Greenwood, U.S. Route 221 continues northeasterly to the city of Coronaca and after crossing a bridge over the Saluda River the concurrency with SC 72 comes to an end. From there US 221 turns north and runs through Waterloo. U.S. Truck Route 221 bypasses the city of Laurens on the east side. After the truck route ends, it continues northeast and then northwest before the interchange with Interstate 385 in rural Laurens County. Returning more toward the northeast, it reaches Enoree and curves to the northwest until reaching Woodruff and curves back to the east-northeast proceeding to intersect Interstate 26 in rural Spartanburg County. Almost immediately after I-26, U.S. Route 221 turns north and continues through the center of the city of Spartanburg serving as the terminus of Interstate 585 before intersecting Interstate 85 just north of the city. Shortly after I-85 it crosses a bridge over the Pacolet River. It continues to the city of Chesnee before exiting the state in a rural area of Cherokee County. The southern terminus of US 221 Alt. intersects the main route in the city of Chesnee and exits the state a few miles to the east of the main route.

History
Established in 1932, US 221 was connected from North Carolina, from north of Cowpens National Battlefield to Greenwood, connecting the cities of Spartanburg, Woodruff, Laurens, and Waterloo.  In 1942, US 221 replaced U.S. Route 221 in South Carolina#South Carolina Highway 110 (SC 110), going due north from Chesnee to the North Carolina state line; its former route became US 221 Alternate.  In 1954, US 221 was extended south to Bradley and McCormick, then south over the Clarks Hill Dam into Georgia; this replaced part of SC 10 and part of SC 670.

Between 1962 and 1964, US 221 bypassed Roebuck.  Between 1968 and 1970, US 221 was rerouted onto the Greenwood Bypass and its current routing south of US 25/US 178, replacing the remaining part of SC 670.  The old route through Greenwood became SC 72 Business and an extension of SC 10.

South Carolina Highway 104

The next year, its northern terminus was extended to the north-northwest to SC 10 northeast of Troy. In 1947, the highway was decommissioned and downgraded to secondary roads. Most of its path was redesignated as parts of US 221.

Troy alternate route

South Carolina Highway 104 Alternate (SC 104 Alt.) was an alternate route that was established in 1942 from where SC 104 and SC 432 started a concurrency east-southeast of Troy, in the northeastern part of McCormick County to a point along their concurrency. In 1947, it was decommissioned. It is known today as Indianland Road and Dowtin Road.

South Carolina Highway 110

South Carolina Highway 110 (SC 110) was a state highway that was established in 1931 from US 378 in Chesnee north to the North Carolina state line, where it continued as the second iteration of North Carolina Highway 741. In 1942, US 221 was shifted to the west, replacing SC 110. Its former path was redesignated as US 221 Alternate.

Major intersections

Special routes

There is one truck route and one alternate route in South Carolina.

See also

References

External links

US 221 at Virginia Highways' South Carolina Highways Annex

21-2
 South Carolina
Transportation in McCormick County, South Carolina
Transportation in Greenwood County, South Carolina
Transportation in Laurens County, South Carolina
Transportation in Spartanburg County, South Carolina
Transportation in Cherokee County, South Carolina
Greenwood, South Carolina
Spartanburg, South Carolina